The Ministry of Foreign Affairs of the Russian Federation (MFA Russia; , МИД РФ) is the central government institution charged with leading the foreign policy and foreign relations of Russia. It is a continuation of the Ministry of Foreign Affairs of the Russian Soviet Federative Socialist Republic, which was under the supervision of the Soviet Ministry of External Relations. Sergei Lavrov is the current foreign minister.

Structure of the Russian Ministry of Foreign Affairs 
The structure of the Russian MFA central office includes divisions, which are referred to as departments. Departments are divided into sections. Russian MFA Departments are headed by Directors and their sections by Heads. According to Presidential Decree 1163 of September 11, 2007, the Ministry is divided into 39 departments. Departments are divided into territorial (relations between Russia and foreign countries, grouped according to conventional regions) and functional (according to assigned functions). Each department employs 30-60 diplomats.

In addition, there are four divisions under the Ministry of Foreign Affairs of Russia: the Main Production and Commercial Department for servicing the diplomatic staff under the Ministry of Foreign Affairs of Russia, the Diplomatic Academy of the Ministry of Foreign Affairs of Russia, the Moscow State Institute of International Relations, the Foreign Ministry College and the Russian Center for International Scientific and Cultural Cooperation.

Outside the departmental structure, there are Ambassadors for special assignments, each responsible for a particular issue of international relations (for example, the Georgian-Abkhaz settlement). The ambassadors for special assignments report directly to the deputy ministers.

Functioning of the Ministry of Foreign Affairs 
The Ministry of Foreign Affairs is a federal executive authority responsible for the development and implementation of state policy and normative-legal regulation in the field of international relations of the Russian Federation

The President of the Russian Federation is the head of the Foreign Ministry.

The main function of the ministry is to develop an overall foreign policy strategy, submit relevant proposals to the President and implement the foreign policy course.

The Ministry of Foreign Affairs operates directly and through diplomatic representations and consular offices of the Russian Federation, representations of the Russian Federation to international organisations, and territorial offices of the Russian Ministry of Foreign Affairs on the territory of Russia. The MFA system includes the central office; foreign institutions; territorial offices; organisations subordinate to the MFA of Russia, which ensures its work on Russian territory. The Ministry of Foreign Affairs is guided by the Constitution, federal constitutional laws, federal laws, acts of the President and the Government, and international treaties.

The Ministry of Foreign Affairs is headed by the Minister of Foreign Affairs, who is appointed to the post by the President on the proposal of the Prime Minister. The Minister is personally responsible for the implementation of the powers entrusted to the Ministry of Foreign Affairs and the implementation of state policy in the relevant area of work. The Minister has deputies, also appointed by the President.

Minister of Foreign Affairs 
The Minister of Foreign Affairs is the head of the Foreign Ministry. The Minister represents Russia in bilateral and multilateral negotiations and signs international treaties; divides responsibilities between his deputies and the Director-General; approves regulations for the structural subdivisions of the central apparatus; and appoints senior officials from the central apparatus, foreign agencies and territorial bodies.

Russia's Permanent Mission to the United Nations 
The Permanent Mission of Russia to the United Nations is one of the most important foreign offices of the Ministry of Foreign Affairs. The Permanent Mission conducts negotiations on behalf of the Russian Federation on the most important problems of international relations. The Representative Office is headed by the Permanent Representative appointed by the President on the proposal of the Minister for Foreign Affairs. The Permanent Representative represents Russia in all UN structures, including meetings of the Security Council. In special cases, the Minister for Foreign Affairs himself may take his place.

In terms of the number of staff, the Russian mission is one of the largest at the UN. There is even a secondary school with a profound study of English.

List of heads of Foreign Affairs

Overseas schools

The ministry operates a network of overseas schools for children of Russian diplomats.

First Deputy Foreign Ministers of the Russian Federation
 Fyodor Shelov-Kovedyayev (19 October 1991 – 16 October 1992)
 Pyotr Aven (11 November 1991 – 22 February 1992)
 Anatoly Adamishin (16 October 1992 – 14 November 1994)
 Igor Ivanov (30 December 1993 – 24 September 1998)
 Boris Pastukhov (3 February 1996 – 25 September 1998)
 Aleksandr Avdeyev (30 October 1998 – 21 February 2002)
 Vyacheslav Trubnikov (28 June 2000 – 29 July 2004)
 Valery Loshchinin (22 February 2002 – 26 December 2005)
 Eleonora Mitrofanova (21 May 2003 – 13 August 2004)
 Andrei Denisov (8 April 2006 – 22 April 2013)

Current First Deputy Foreign Minister
 Vladimir Titov (22 April 2013 – present)
(relations with European countries)

Deputy Foreign Ministers of the Russian Federation
 Boris Kolokolov (24 April 1981 – 21 February 1996)
 Georgy Kunadze (20 March 1991 – 30 December 1993)
 Andrei Kolosovsky (18 June 1991 – 16 September 1993)
 Georgy Mamedov (26 December 1991 – 5 June 2003)
 Boris Pastukhov (22 February 1992 – 3 February 1996)
 Sergei Lavrov (3 April 1992 – 3 November 1994)
 Vitaly Churkin (4 June 1992 – 11 November 1994)
 Sergei Krylov (8 October 1993 – 20 December 1996)
 Aleksandr Panov (30 December 1993 – 15 October 1996)
 Albert Chernyshyov (30 December 1993 – 13 June 1996)
 Nikolai Afanasyevsky (3 November 1994 – 6 January 1999)
 Viktor Posuvalyuk (14 November 1994 – 1 August 1999)
 Yury Dubinin (20 December 1994 – 13 June 1996)
 Vasily Sidorov (9 November 1995 – 28 January 1998)
 Yury Zubakov (3 February 1996 – 14 September 1998)
 Ivan Kuznetsov (26 February 1996 – 14 April 1997)
 Aleksandr Avdeyev (20 December 1996 – 30 October 1998)
 Ivan Sergeyev (14 April 1997 – 17 November 2001)
 Yury Ushakov (28 January 1998 – 2 March 1999)
 Yury Proshin (25 May 1998 – 2 August 1999)
 Vasily Sredin (30 October 1998 – 17 October 2001)
 Leonid Drachevsky (16 November 1998 – 25 May 1999)
 Yevgeny Gusarov (6 January 1999 – 7 October 2002)
 Sergei Ordzhonikidze (2 March 1999 – 26 February 2002)
 Ivan Ivanov (6 July 1999 – 13 September 2001)
 Grigory Berdennikov (27 March 1992 – 16 September 1993; 18 October 1999 – 2 April 2001)
 Viktor Kalyuzhny (31 May 2000 – 29 July 2004)
 Aleksei Fedotov (7 July 2000 – 11 March 2004)
 Valery Loshchinin (7 April 2001 – 22 February 2002)
 Anatoly Safonov (4 October 2001 – 13 August 2004)
 Aleksandr Saltanov (17 October 2001 – 5 May 2011)
 Andrei Denisov (28 December 2001 – 12 July 2004)
 Anatoly Potapov (14 January 2002 – 17 February 2004)
 Sergei Razov (18 March 2002 – 10 June 2005)
 Yury Fedotov (7 June 2002 – 9 June 2005)
 Vladimir Chizhov (10 November 2002 – 15 July 2005)
 Sergei Kislyak (4 July 2003 – 26 July 2008)
 Doku Zavgayev (17 February – 13 August 2004)
 Aleksandr Alekseyev (13 August 2004 – 3 January 2007)
 Aleksandr Yakovenko (5 August 2005 – 24 January 2011)
 Vladimir Titov (19 October 2005 – 22 April 2013)
 Aleksandr Losyukov (23 March 2000 – 2 March 2004; 3 January 2007 – 26 March 2008)
 Aleksei Borodavkin (26 March 2008 – 5 December 2011)
 Aleksei Meshkov (6 September 2001 – 20 January 2004; 25 December 2012 – 23 October 2017)
 Vasily Nebenzya (1 June 2013 – 26 July 2017)
 Anatoly Antonov (29 December 2016 – 21 August 2017)
 Gennady Gatilov (24 January 2011 – 31 January 2018)
 Grigory Karasin (27 July 1996 – 25 March 2000; 10 June 2005 – 10 September 2019)

Current Deputy Foreign Ministers
 Yevgeny Ivanov (5 October 2017 – present)
 (State-Secretary; relations with CIS countries, relations with other state bodies)
 Sergei Ryabkov (15 August 2008 – present)
 (relations with American countries and security and disarmament issues)
 Mikhail Bogdanov (12 June 2011 – present)
 (relations with African countries and the Middle East)
 Igor Morgulov (22 December 2011 – present)
 (relations with Asian countries)
 Oleg Syromolotov (19 March 2015 – present)
 (on countering terrorism)
 Aleksandr Pankin (23 October 2017 – present)
 (relations with European organizations, countries of Western and Southern Europe)
 Aleksandr Grushko (6 September 2005 – 23 October 2012; 22 January 2018 – present)
 Sergei Vershinin (27 March 2018 – present)
 Andrei Rudenko (19 September 2019 – present)

General Directors of the Ministry of Foreign Affairs of the Russian Federation
 Doku Zavgayev (13 August 2004 – 23 September 2009)
 Mikhail Vanin (23 September 2009 – 6 April 2012)
 Sergei Mareyev (6 April 2012 – 22 August 2015)

Current General Director of the Ministry of Foreign Affairs
 Sergei Vyazalov (22 August 2015 – present)

See also 

Foreign Intelligence Service of the Russian Federation (SVR)
Foreign relations of Russia
Russian Foreign Services

In connection with the Moscow building that houses the Ministry's main office:
All-Russia Exhibition Centre
Hotel Leningradskaya
Ministry of Heavy Industry of Russia
Moscow State University
Palace of Soviets
Academy of Science (Riga)
Seven Sisters (Moscow)
Triumph-Palace
Warsaw Palace of Culture and Science

References

External links 
 
 Ministry of Foreign Affairs of the Russian Federation 
 Ministry of Foreign Affairs of the Russian Federation 

 
Foreign Affairs, Ministry of
Russia